No Man's Land is a 1984 American made-for-television Western film. The film featured Marc Alaimo, Donna Dixon, Terri Garber, Jack Garner, Estelle Getty, Sam J. Jones, Janis Paige, and Stella Stevens. It was directed by Rod Holcomb and written by Juanita Bartlett.

Plot
The sheriff of a western town has three daughters by different men. Each has inherited: skills...magic, gambling & tomboy/cowboy. Together they help their mother catch a band of outlaws.

Cast
 Marc Alaimo as Clay Allison
 Wil Albert as Wilmot
 Frank Bonner as Deputy Thad Prouty
 Donna Dixon as Sarah Wilder
 Terri Garber as Brianne Wilder
 Jack Garner as Simon Claypool
 Estelle Getty as Eurol Muller
 Sam J. Jones as Eli Howe
 Bryan Michael McGuire as Dandy Wallace
 Ralph Michael as Doc Havilland
 Melissa Michaelsen as Missy Wilder
 Janis Paige as Maggie Hodiak
 John Quade as Henry Lambert
 Eldon Quick as Everett Vanders
 Dack Rambo as Connell
 John Rhys-Davies as Grimshaw
 D. Hampton Rice as Pecos Rankin
 Jeremy Ross as Pratt
 Stella Stevens as Nellie Wilder
 Billy Streater as Holden
 Tony Swartz as Monroe
 Buck Taylor as Feeny
 Robert Webber as Will Blackfield
 Roz Witt as Harriet Claypool
 Tom Willett as Cowboy prisoner (uncredited)

References

External links
 

1984 films
1984 Western (genre) films
1980s English-language films
American Western (genre) television films
Films directed by Rod Holcomb
NBC network original films
1980s American films